Ayilpatty is a village in Namakkal district of Tamil Nadu, India. It is surrounded by mountains, including Anandhai Mountain to the west, Kottaikaruppu Mountain to the southwest, and Raasi Malai to the northwest.

Ayilpatty has various schools, including one self-financing polytechnic college: Raasi Polytechnic College.

Bus transportation is the primary mode of transportation for the village.

Temples 
Anandhai Amman and Maari Amman are the prominent temples. The yearly Thaer Thiruvizha is the most famous festival in Ayilpatty. This celebration extends for four days.

The famous temple which pachayamman also located in ayilpatty,

External links
 Govt Website for Namakkal District : Namakkal Portal

Villages in Namakkal district